Gratis Township is one of the twelve townships of Preble County, Ohio, United States.  The 2000 census found 4,471 people in the township, 3,343 of whom lived in the unincorporated portions of the township.

Geography
Located in the southeastern corner of the county, it borders the following townships:
Lanier Township - north
Jackson Township, Montgomery County - northeast corner
German Township, Montgomery County - east
Madison Township, Butler County - southeast
Wayne Township, Butler County - south
Milford Township, Butler County - southwest corner
Somers Township - west
Gasper Township - northwest corner

Two incorporated villages are located in Gratis Township: Gratis in the north, and West Elkton in the south.

Name and history
According to tradition, Gratis Township's name is derived from the original request, namely "we think we ought to have the township gratis". It is the only Gratis Township statewide.

Government
The township is governed by a three-member board of trustees, who are elected in November of odd-numbered years to a four-year term beginning on the following January 1. Two are elected in the year after the presidential election and one is elected in the year before it. There is also an elected township fiscal officer, who serves a four-year term beginning on April 1 of the year after the election, which is held in November of the year before the presidential election. Vacancies in the fiscal officership or on the board of trustees are filled by the remaining trustees.

References

External links
Township Officials 
County website

Townships in Preble County, Ohio
Townships in Ohio